Yedanthasthula Meda is a 1980 Telugu-language drama film, produced under the Jhansi Enterprises banner and directed by Dasari Narayana Rao. It stars Akkineni Nageswara Rao, Sujatha and Jaya Sudha, with music composed by Chakravarthy. The film was remade in Hindi as Pyaasa Sawan (1981) and in Tamil as Maadi Veettu Ezhai (1981).

Plot 
The film begins with Ranga Rao (Akkineni Nageswara Rao), an unemployed youth. A big shot Prabhakar Rao (Prabhakar Reddy) offers him a job without any questions by misinterpreting Ranga Rao as his tycoon friend's son. Moreover, he intends to knit his daughter Janaki (Sujatha) with Ranga Rao. After some time, the truth comes forward, still, Ranga Rao & Janaki nuptial against the elders' wish. Soon after, they go through a tough time and face several humiliations. Hence, distressed Ranga Rao decides to avenge, builds a huge empire through hard labour, and the couple is blessed with a baby boy Venu. However, in this process, Ranga Rao neglects Janaki, and by the time he awakes, she becomes terminally ill. Ranga Rao tries hard to save her with his wealth but no use. Years roll by, Ranga Rao raises his son Venu (again Akkineni Nageswara Rao) with indulgence, and he marries his lover Sudha (Jaya Sudha). Now, Ranga Rao assigns the entire business to Venu and leaves for a vacation. Unfortunately, Venu repeats the same with Sudha which leads to divorce. Being aware of it, Ranga Rao returns and makes Venu understand the eminence of a wife by narrating his past. Immediately he rushes for Sudha, and she too moves. Finally, the movie ends on a happy note with the reunion of the couple.

Cast 
Akkineni Nageswara Rao as Ranga Rao & Venu (Dual role)
Sujatha as Janaki
Jaya Sudha as Sudha
Jaya Prada as Special appearance
Jaggayya as Jananatham
Prabhakar Reddy as Prabhakar Rao
K. V. Chalam as Manager
Athili Lakshmi as Janaki's mother
Jhansi as Lakshmi

Soundtrack 
Music composed by Chakravarthy.

References

External links 

1980 drama films
1980 films
1980s Telugu-language films
Films directed by Dasari Narayana Rao
Films scored by K. Chakravarthy
Indian drama films
Telugu films remade in other languages